The University of Tennessee Athletic Council, chaired by Professor Nathan Dougherty, officially suspended varsity football during the World War I years of 1917 and 1918 because the majority of the players were called into military service. In addition, Coach John R. Bender was enlisted as an instructor at Camp John Sevier in Greenville, South Carolina.

During this period without varsity football, two unofficial teams were formed from Army recruits and students. One team represented a training unit called the Fighting Mechanics and the other team represented the Student Army Training Corps (SATC).

Vanderbilt's program considers the game between the two schools as an official game, however, University of Tennessee does not since most of their team was enlisted in the military fighting in World War I.

Schedule

Notes

References

Tennessee
Tennessee Volunteers football seasons
Tennessee (SATC) football